Rambhakta Memorial School (RMS) is a school in Banepa-8, Kavrepalanchok District in Nepal. It was founded in 2005 in memory of Rambhakta Kokh Shrestha.  It is a coeducational school, with a pre-school through 10 grade program. The school currently enrolls approximately 210 students. This school has one of the better educational facilities in Kavre with an international education system that has been adopted by Nepal's top schools.  Currently Suman Kokh Shrestha, the son of Rambhakta Kokh Shrestha is running the school. 

Schools in Nepal
Education in Kavrepalanchok District
2005 establishments in Nepal